The Graflight V-8 is an aircraft diesel engine developed by Wisconsin-based Engineered Propulsion Systems

Design 
The Graflight V-8 is a liquid-cooled, flat V-8 with steel pistons and compacted graphite iron crankcase for better strength and durability than aluminum at similar weight, increasing time between overhauls to 3,000 hours. It is managed by a Bosch ECU and can run on Jet A, JP-8 or straight diesel fuel. It is intended to be used in general aviation airplanes, small helicopters, military drones, small boats or troop carriers. The engine is specifically targeting the Robinson R44, Beech Bonanza, GippsAero GA8 Airvan, Cessna TTx and Cessna 206 as possible applications.

At , it weighs  more than a conventional aircraft engine, not including the  radiator for cooling. It should be 30-40% more expensive to purchase than a comparable avgas engine, but with 30-50% better fuel economy. Its low vibration levels allow the use of composite or aluminum propellers.

It is expected that the Graflight V-8 will burn under  of fuel at 65% power.

As a direct comparison, the  version of the Graflight V-8 engine will weigh  more than the comparable Lycoming TIO-540-AE2A ( dry) or Continental TSIO-550-E ( dry). It will cost 30% more, but with a higher time between overhaul and lower fuel burn, it will have lower operating costs. At normal 75% cruise power, the Graflight V-8 consumes  of fuel, whereas the Continental TSIO-550-E burns , a reduction of 30%.

Development
EPS set out to certify a new-design flat 8 engine, to replace existing  general aviation gasoline engines, with the aim of reducing fuel costs by 45%. EPS started work on the design in 2006, a process that took five years. The engine was first flown in May 2014, first exhibited at the 2017 EAA AirVenture and FAA certification was expected at that time by the end of the year.

Later in 2017 the testing progress was delayed by insufficient funding. By July 2018 it had completed 25 hours of flight testing on a Cirrus Aircraft airplane. At that point the company hoped to attract Fortune 500 investors and planned that a new demonstrator should be ready in the first quarter of 2019. The production version of the engine was shown at AERO Friedrichshafen in April 2019 and work continued on environmental and block testing towards the goal of type certification.

Unable to obtain the needed financing to continue operations, the company filed for Chapter 11 bankruptcy protection in August 2020.

Applications
Cirrus SR22

Specifications (Graflight V-8)

References

External links
Company website

Aircraft diesel engines
2010s aircraft piston engines